Joey Daleboudt (born ), better known by his stage name Joey Dale, is a Dutch DJ, record producer and musician.

The majority of his releases are on Hardwell's label Revealed Recordings.

Career 
In 2014, Dale collaborated with Dutch DJ Hardwell to release the song "Arcadia" which charted in Belgium and France. In 2015, he released "Winds" with Rico & Miella. In 2016, he collaborated with American producer Ryos to release the song "Armageddon" featuring singer/songwriter Tony Rodini via Revealed Recordings. He also released "Crowd Control" with Pitchback and "Lights Out" with Quintino.

Discography

Singles

Charting singles

Other singles
 2013: Cracked [Oxygen (Spinnin')]
 2013: POING! (with Justin Prime) (Original Mix) [Dim Mak Records]
 2014: Ready for Action (with Alvaro) [Spinnin Records]
 2014: Shockwave [Revealed Recordings]
 2014: Watcha Called Me [Revealed Recordings]
 2014: About the Drop Out [Revealed Recordings]
 2014: Arcadia (with Hardwell) [Revealed Recordings]
 2014: Step Into Your Light (featuring Natalie Angiuli) (with Ares Carter) [Zouk Recordings (Armada)]
 2014: Deja Vu (featuring Delora) (with Dvbbs) [Spinnin Records]
 2014: Access Denied [Doorn (Spinnin)]
 2015: Gladiator [Revealed Recordings]
 2015: Zodiac [Revealed Recordings]
 2015: Haunted House [Revealed Recordings]
 2015: The Harder They Fall [Revealed Recordings]
 2015: Timecode (with Thomas Newson) [Revealed Recordings]
 2015: Winds (with Rico & Miella) [Revealed Recordings]
 2015: Epsilon [Revealed Recordings]
 2016: Where Dreams Are Made (featuring Monstere) [Revealed Recordings]
 2016: Long Way Home (with Paris & Simo and Brandon Lethi) [Revealed Recordings]
 2016: Lights Out (with Quintino and Channi Monroe) [Spinnin Records]
 2016: "Makes Me Wonder" (with Reece Low) [Armada Trice] 
 2016: "Armageddon" (with Ryos and Tony Rodini) [Revealed Recordings]
 2016: "Everest" (with Ravitez) [Wall Recordings]
 2016: "Higher" (with Olly James) [Revealed Recordings]
 2016: "Crowd Control" (with Pitchback) [Revealed Recordings]
 2016: "Shake It" (with Maddix) [Revealed Recordings]
 2017: "Rogue Ones" (with Adventurer and Micah Martin) [Revealed Recordings]
 2017: "Show Me" [Mixmash Deep]
 2017: "Taking Me Home" (with Anthony Dircson featuring Kennedy Ihaka) [Houston, Taxes]
 2017: "Under My Sheets" (with Rico & Miella) [Joey Dale Music]
 2017: "Black Sahara" (with Kaaze featuring Aloma Steele) [Revealed Recordings]
 2018: "All In My Head" (with Luca Testa featuring Phillip Matta) [Maxximize]

Remixes
 2015: Swanky Tunes, C. Todd Nielsen - Fire In Our Hearts (Joey Dale Remix) [Revealed Recordings]

References

Notes
 A  Did not enter the Ultratop 50, but peaked on the Flemish Ultratip chart.
 B  Did not enter the Ultratop 50, but peaked on the Walloon Ultratip chart.
 C  Did not enter the Ultratop 50, but peaked on the Dance Bubbling Under chart.

Sources

External links
 

1993 births
Living people
Dutch dance musicians
Dutch DJs
Dutch record producers
Dutch house musicians
Remixers
Musicians from Rotterdam
Revealed Recordings artists
Electronic dance music DJs